Hum Se Badhkar Kaun is a 1981 Indian Hindi-language action film directed by Deepak Bahry, starring Mithun Chakraborty, Vijayendra Ghatge, Ranjeeta, Amjad Khan, Danny Denzongpa, Kajal Kiran and Ranjeet.

Plot
Radha lives a poor lifestyle with her husband, Mohan, and four sons, Chandan, Raju, Bablu, and Pappu. Although Mohan comes from a rich family, his dad had disapproved of his marriage, and since that day he has not met with him. Now his dad is very ill and the entire family goes to visit him, and are welcomed with open arms. Before he dies, he shows Mohan the family's treasure, which consists of gold and jewellery, hidden under a temple, which can only be opened by four different keys. Mohan asks his children to keep one key. Then his dad dies, and Lalchand, an employee, who has overheard the conversation between father and son decides to keep the treasure to himself. He ends up killing Mohan, getting himself arrested and sentenced to a long prison term. Alone and widowed, Radha, gets separated from her sons and loses her mind. Years later the sons have grown up. Chandan calls himself Bholaram and runs a dairy farm; Raju is a career thief and burglar and goes by the name of Johny; Bablu is the DSP of Police, Vijay; while the youngest, Pappu, also has taken to a life of crime and calls himself Tony. The lives of these four young men are all set to collide with each other with Bholaram and Vijay on the side of the law, and Johny and Tony on the run from them. The question that comes to mind is will the four brothers ever get to meet their mom in this lifetime, and what of the treasure that is still buried beneath the temple?

Cast
Amjad Khan as Chandan / Bholaram
Danny Denzongpa as Raju / Johny
Vijayendra Ghatge as Bablu / DSP Vijay
Mithun Chakraborty as Pappu / Tony
Ranjeeta Kaur as Tina
Kajal Kiran as Rekha 
Purnima as Radha
Ranjeet as Lalchand
Neeta Mehta as Jina
Padmini Kapila as Kammo

Soundtrack
Lyrics: Ravinder Rawal

Box office
The film was a super hit and twenty fifth highest-grossing movie of 1981.

References

External links
 

1981 films
1980s Hindi-language films
Films scored by Raamlaxman
Indian action drama films
Films directed by Deepak Bahry